The Dare County Bombing Range is a US Air Force managed and operated facility and is located in Dare County, North Carolina. The range serves as an air to surface bombing range for the US Air Force and US Navy who is a tenant command on the northern portion of the range The range is also used for some select special operations and Joint Terminal Attack Control (JTAC) training due to its remote location and harsh landscapes. The traffic is mostly light jet aircraft dropping 25 lb to 2000 lb dummy bombs. The most common sights at the range are the F-15E Strike Eagle, F/A-18 Hornet, Sikorsky UH-60 Black Hawk, and the T-34 Mentor.

References

External links
A youtube video of an F/A-18 performing a low pass by the tower at Navy Dare.
United States of America v. Harry C. Mann ( Full indictment )

United States Navy installations
Bombing ranges
Geography of Dare County, North Carolina